WFMB-FM (104.5 MHz) is a commercial FM radio station licensed to Springfield, Illinois.  It broadcasts a country music radio format and is owned by Neuhoff Corp., through licensee Neuhoff Media Springfield, LLC.  

WFMB-FM has an effective radiated power (ERP) of 43,000 watts.  The radio studios and transmitter are on South 4th Street in Southern View, Illinois, using a Springfield address.

History
The original call sign was simply WFMB. The "-FM" suffix was added in 1991 just before its AM counterpart took the WFMB call letters. The station's studios and transmitter were located at the First National Bank Building at 5th and Adams. The station was owned by Capital Broadcasting. In 1972, the station's studios and transmitter were moved to the Myers Brothers Building. 

In 1980, the station was sold to Springfield Advertising Co. for $1,275,000. In 1981, the station moved to its current location on the 3000 block of South 4th Street.

In 1989, the station was sold to Neuhoff Broadcasting, along with AM 1450 WCVS, for $4,250,000. In 1996, the station was sold to Patterson Broadcasting.  After a series of acquisitions, Patterson Broadcasting became part of Clear Channel Communications. In 2007, as Clear Channel was selling most of its stations in smaller markets, Neuhoff bought back the Springfield stations the company had sold, including WFMB-FM.

The station has long aired a country music format.  It was originally automated and added live disc jockeys in the 1980s.

References

External links
 WFMB's website

Country radio stations in the United States
FMB-FM
Radio stations established in 1965
1965 establishments in Illinois